Sir William Harold Webbe, CBE DL (30 September 1885 – 22 April 1965) was a British politician. He was a Conservative Member of Parliament (MP) from 1939 to 1959.

Born in Solihull, Webbe was educated at King Edward's School, Birmingham and Queens' College, Cambridge, which he attended from 1904 to 1907. During World War I, he worked at the Ministry of Munitions. He worked as a director of several companies.

Webbe was a member of the London County Council from 1925 to 1949, representing Camberwell North West and then serving as an alderman, and he led the Municipal Reform Party on the council for 12 years. He was a Deputy Lieutenant of the County of London. On 17 May 1939, he was first elected to Parliament in a by-election in the London constituency of Westminster Abbey, following the death of Sir Sidney Herbert, Bt. He remained the seat's MP until it was abolished for the 1950 general election, when he was elected for the new constituency of the Cities of London and Westminster. He retired from Parliament at the 1959 general election. He died in Surrey aged 79.

References

Sources

External links 
 

1885 births
1965 deaths
Alumni of Queens' College, Cambridge
Commanders of the Order of the British Empire
Conservative Party (UK) MPs for English constituencies
Deputy Lieutenants of the County of London
Members of London County Council
UK MPs 1935–1945
UK MPs 1945–1950
UK MPs 1950–1951
UK MPs 1951–1955
UK MPs 1955–1959
Municipal Reform Party politicians
Knights Bachelor